Archery has been contested at the Military World Games since the 2015 edition.

Editions
 Archery at the 2015 Military World Games
 Archery at the 2019 Military World Games

All-time medal table

References

 
Military World Games
Military World Games